AB8 or AB-8 may refer to:

 Aichi AB-8, see List of aircraft (0-A)
 AB8 (star), a Wolf-Rayet binary star in the Small Magellanic Cloud
 ArenaBowl VIII